Gerald Scott Abel (December 25, 1944 – July 2, 2021) was an American professional ice hockey left winger. He is the son of Hockey Hall of Fame member Sid Abel and the uncle of former goaltender Brent Johnson. He played one game in the National Hockey League during the 1966–67 season, with the Detroit Red Wings on March 8, 1967 against the New York Rangers. The rest of his career, which lasted from 1965 to 1968, was spent in the minor leagues.

Playing career
Abel played junior hockey for the Hamilton Red Wings signing with the Detroit Red Wings. His father Sid was the head coach of the Red Wings at the time and upon signing, Gerry was quoted as saying "If I could be half as good as my dad, I'd be happy". In the end though, Abel played in only one National Hockey League game for the Red Wings during the 1966–67 NHL season, spending much of the season playing for the Memphis Wings as well as two games for the American Hockey League's Pittsburgh Hornets. After another season with Memphis, Abel retired from hockey.

Career statistics

Regular season and playoffs

See also
 List of players who played only one game in the NHL

References

External links
 

1944 births
2021 deaths
American men's ice hockey left wingers
Detroit Red Wings players
Fort Worth Wings players
Hamilton Red Wings (OHA) players
Ice hockey people from Detroit
Memphis Wings players
Pittsburgh Hornets players